Sternocera pulchra is a beetle species found in Tanzania.

References

Endemic fauna of Tanzania
Buprestidae
Beetles described in 1879
Beetles of Africa